The Punyabhushan award (translation: Jewel of Pune) is awarded every year to an eminent personality from the field of art, music, culture, science, industry, social service, or sports in a special public function in the city of Pune Maharashtra, India.

The award is announced every year by the Punyabhushan Foundation on 23 March with a view to commemorate the memory of Indian revolutionary martyrs Bhagat Singh, Sukhdev, and Rajguru.

List of awardees
The following persons have received Punyabhushan Awards.

References

Awards established in 1989
Indian awards